The discography of American rock band Spoon consists of 10 studio albums, four extended plays (EPs), and 26 singles. Formed in 1993 in Austin, Texas by Britt Daniel (vocals, guitar) and Jim Eno (drums), Spoon released their debut studio album, Telephono, in 1996 on Matador Records. Their follow-up full-length, A Series of Sneaks, was released in 1998 on Elektra, who subsequently dropped the band. Spoon went on to sign with Merge Records, where Spoon gained greater commercial success and critical acclaim with the albums Girls Can Tell (2001), Kill the Moonlight (2002), and particularly Gimme Fiction (2005), which debuted at number 44 on the Billboard 200 and sold over 300,000 copies in the US. The group's next three albums - Ga Ga Ga Ga Ga (2007), Transference (2010), and They Want My Soul (2014) - reached the top 10 of the US charts, while the latter two peaked in the top 20 in Canada and the top 50 in Australia. The band's ninth album, Hot Thoughts, was released on March 17, 2017.

Albums

Studio albums

Compilation albums

Remix albums

Extended plays
 Nefarious (1994, Fluffer)
 Soft Effects (1997, Matador; Reissued 2006, Merge)
 30 Gallon Tank (1998, Elektra)
 Love Ways (2000, Merge)
 Don't You Evah (2008, Merge)
 Got Nuffin (2009, Merge)

Singles

Other charting songs

Other songs
 "Primary (Nefarious Mix)" on "Dreamboat" (1995, Cassiel Records)
 "Don't Buy the Realistic" and "Telamon Bridge" on What's Up Matador? (1997, Matador Records)
 "Operation In Progress" on Rock and Roll Free-For-All Vol. 2 (1997, Nickel & Dime Records)
 "Tear Me Down" on Wig in a Box (2003, Off Records)
 "Decora" (Yo La Tengo cover) on The Believer 2005 Music Issue CD (2005, The Believer)
 "The Book I Write" and 3 previously released tracks on Stranger than Fiction Original Soundtrack (2006, Columbia Records/Sony)
 "Well-Alright" on Dark Was the Night (2009, 4AD)

Notes

References

External links
 Official website
 Spoon at AllMusic
 

Rock music group discographies
Discographies of American artists